Brahman Naman  is a 2016 English-language Indian sex comedy film directed by Qaushiq Mukherjee. It was shown in the World Cinema Dramatic Competition section at the 2016 Sundance Film Festival. It was released on Netflix worldwide on 7 July 2016.

Plot
A group of young sex-starved college kids search for women who are willing to take their virginity in 1980's Bangalore.

Cast
 Shashank Arora as Naman
 Tanmay Dhanania as Ajay
 Chaitanya Varad
 Sid Mallya as Ronnie
 Denzil Smith as Bernie
 Biswa Kalyan Rath as Illash
 Vaishwath Shankar as Randy
 Shataf Figar as Brian D' Costa
 Sindhu Sreenivasa Murthy as Ash
 Anula Navlekar as Miss Naina

References

External links
 

2016 films
2010s sex comedy films
Indian sex comedy films
English-language Netflix original films
English-language Indian films
2016 comedy films
Films directed by Qaushiq Mukherjee
2010s English-language films